Xpress Air was a domestic regular airline that offered direct flights to the eastern parts of Indonesia, with its first flight in 2005, and from 2014 international routes to Malaysia. Beginning with two Boeing 737s, Xpress Air was the first privately owned, scheduled airline to connect Jakarta to 24 domestic destinations like Makassar (formerly known as Ujung Pandang), Ternate, Sorong, Manokwari and Jayapura. Makassar was a main hub for all flights coming from Java to the eastern cities of Indonesia, while Sorong was a second hub in Papua, connecting remote places surrounding the West Papua area. The airline ceased all operations in 2021.

History
Express Air began commercial operations between Jayapura and Jakarta on June 23, 2003. The airline had grown to become one of the major airlines in eastern Indonesia. Xpress Air was done several major fleet expansion to serve more destinations along West-East Papua axis, Sulawesi, Maluku and Nusa Tenggara region. The vision to also offer routes to the western regions has been met as Xpress Air has connecting people to Yogyakarta, Surabaya, Pontianak and more.

In 2012, Xpress Air adopted a new branding name (from Express Air to Xpress Air to represent a more modern and customer-friendly airline), a new strategy and a fresh new slogan "Terbanglah Indonesia", maintaining the culture and tradition of a friendly airline with new, modern advancements and motivation.

In 2021 the airline ceased all operations.

Destinations

Destinations at time of closure

Balikpapan - Sepinggan International Airport
Bandar Lampung - Radin Inten II International Airport
Banjarbaru - Syamsudin Noor International Airport
Banyuwangi - Banyuwangi International Airport
Batam - Hang Nadim International Airport 
Berau - Berau Airport
Dabo - Dabo Airport
Fakfak - Fakfak Torea Airport
Sentani - Sentani International Airport
Matak - Matak Airport
Malinau - Robert Atty Bessing Airport
Manokwari - Rendani Airport
Nunukan - Nunukan Airport
Palembang - Sultan Mahmud Badaruddin II Airport
Pangkalan Bun - Iskandar Airport
Pontianak - Supadio International Airport
Ranai - Ranai Airport
Samarinda - Samarinda International Airport
Semarang - Ahmad Yani International Airport
Surakarta - Adisumarmo International Airport
Tanjung Pinang - Raja Haji Fisabilillah Airport Hub
Yogyakarta - Adisutjipto International Airport

Terminated destinations before closure

Bandung - Husein Sastranegara International Airport
Jakarta - Soekarno Hatta International Airport
Makassar - Sultan Hasanuddin International Airport
Padang - Minangkabau International Airport
Pekanbaru - Sultan Syarif Kasim II International Airport
Sleman - Adisucipto International Airport

Johor Bahru - Senai International Airport
Kuching - Kuching International Airport
Melaka - Melaka International Airport
Miri - Miri International Airport

Fleet

Last active fleet
As of early 2021 the Xpress Air fleet consists of the following aircraft:

Retired fleet before closure
The airline previously operated the following aircraft:
 5 Boeing 737-200 (one preserved in Museum Angkut, Batu)
 6 Dornier 328
 1 Dornier 328JET
 1 Boeing 737-500

Incidents
 On 6 November 2008, a Dornier 328 that was in service for only six weeks with Express Air had a hard landing at Fakfak Airport. All 36 passengers and crew survived.
 On June 14, 2009, an Express Air Dornier 328 swerved off the runway at Tanahmerah Airport and skidded into an earthen mound. This resulted in substantial damage to the right engine and propeller.
 On 13 May 2013, an Express Air Boeing 737-200 experienced a technical engine problem. The aircraft later landed at Jayapura safely.

References

External links 

Defunct airlines of Indonesia
Airlines established in 2003
Airlines disestablished in 2021
Indonesian brands
Indonesian companies established in 2003